Presidential elections were held in Montenegro on 15 April 2018. Former Prime Minister Milo Đukanović, leader of the ruling DPS was elected as new President of Montenegro in the first round.

Electoral system
The president is elected using the two-round system; if no candidate receives a majority of the vote in the first round, a run-off is held two weeks later. In order to submit their candidacy to the State Electoral Commission, potential candidates needed to collect 7,993 signatures. President is elected every five years, and only is eligible for two terms.

Campaign
The incumbent president, Filip Vujanović, was ineligible for re-election, having already served three terms as president.

President of the ruling DPS, Milo Đukanović, who was touted by the media as the election favourite, initially rejected the possibility of running for president.

In March 2018, Đukanović confirmed that he would run for president, supported by DPS' coalition partner, the Liberal Party (LP), as well as other subjects in the government; Social Democrats (SD), Croatian Civic Initiative (HGI), the New Democratic Power (FORCA), Democratic Union of Albanians (DUA) and the Bosniak Party (BS).

After a series of unsuccessful attempts by the entire opposition to nominate a common candidate, it was clear that the opposition would have more candidates. On 9 March 2018, the presidency of Democratic Front (DF) alliance decides to support the candidacy of independent candidate Mladen Bojanić, which was previously proposed by Democratic Montenegro (DCG) and United Reform Action (URA). Presidency of United Montenegro (UCG) has decided to support the previously announced candidacy of the party leader Goran Danilović, later Presidency of Social Democratic Party (SDP) has consistently supported candidacy of MP Draginja Vuksanović, as first ever female presidential candidate.

From the rest of the opposition have unsuccessfully called upon the UCG and the SDP to withdraw their candidacies and support independent Bojanić as an opposition common candidate, which they have refused. From SDP replied that Bojanić was not a completely independent candidate, alluding to his support for the right-wing Democratic Front list for the 2016 parliamentary election. On 21 March Danilović ultimately withdrew his candidacy and supported Bojanić's candidature.

Candidates
Montenegrin State Electoral Commission (DIK) confirmed seven candidates. Candidate numbers were decided using a random draw on 28 March.

Opinion polls
Poll results are listed in the table below in reverse chronological order, showing the most recent first, and using the date the survey's fieldwork was done, as opposed to the date of publication. If such date is unknown, the date of publication is given instead. The highest percentage figure in each polling survey is displayed in bold, and the background shaded in the leading party's colour. In the instance that there is a tie, then no figure is shaded. The lead column on the right shows the percentage-point difference between the two candidates with the highest figures.

Electoral debates

Results 
Milo Đukanović, candidate of the DPS-led coalition, won the election in the first round, winning 53.9% of the vote. Independent opposition candidate Mladen Bojanić came in second with 33.4% of the popular vote, while Draginja Vuksanović (SDP) was third with 8.2%.

By municipality

Aftermath
In its June 2018 report, issued after the presidential election, the Organization for Security and Co-operation in Europe's Office for Democratic Institutions and Human Rights, Office for Democratic Institutions and Human Rights, called for election reforms in Montenegro, and for more integrity, impartiality and professionalism in election administration.

References

Montenegro
President
Presidential elections in Montenegro
Montenegro